Mokgathi Mokgathi is a Botswanan footballer. He currently plays for the Botswana Defence Force XI. He has also won four caps for the Botswana national football team.

External links
 

Living people
Association football forwards
Botswana footballers
Botswana Defence Force XI F.C. players
Botswana international footballers
Township Rollers F.C. players
Year of birth missing (living people)